In mathematics, the Suslin homology is a homology theory attached to algebraic varieties. It is sometimes called singular homology as it is analogous to the singular homology of topological spaces. 

By definition, given an abelian group A and a scheme X of finite type over a field k, the theory is given by

References 

Algebraic geometry